Niña Niño is a Philippine television drama comedy series broadcast by TV5. Directed by Thop Nazareno, it stars Maja Salvador and Noel Comia Jr. It premiered on April 5, 2021, on the network's Todo Max Primetime Singko line up replacing Paano ang Pangako?. The series concluded on May 19, 2022.  It was replaced by Dear God in its timeslot.

Plot

In the first story, Niña (Maja Salvador) was a girl who does not believe in miracles. She thrived somebody's essentials to benefit her and her Lola Belen (Ruby Ruiz) who was born to Gloria (Lilet) then left for a reason due to poor living. After eight years, she returned to Brgy. Consolacion along with his second child Niño (Noel Comia Jr.). Gloria revealed she was beaten by her own husband and she is trying to get away. After sunset, Lola Belen went missing after long hunting despite that she had died in a collision. Meanwhile, in Belen's demise in the family, they are convinced to start acting as con-artist for their potential income to the siblings, after when Niño had a stomachache, Niña had caught by the tanods of the stealing property and both were run out quickly and they jump on a truck which brings them to Sitio Santa Ynez where they live a new life until an unexpected event changes everything.

While Niña and Niño escaped through the remote area of Sta. Ynez, they had to find ways in receiving true faith for themselves and connected to healing rituals while they found Ka Iking, they had discovered happy thoughts for earning big income and return on the basic act. This little town was ruled by Kapitana Pinang (Dudz Teraña) who was very strict and interested in making more and more money. Later on, they met Isay (Moi Bien).

Cast and characters

Main cast
 Maja Salvador as Niña Domingo
 Noel Comia Jr. as Niño Domingo

Supporting cast
 Lilet as Gloria Domingo
 Arron Villaflor as Bert
 Empoy Marquez as Gardo
 Ian Pangilinan as Pol
 Sachzna Laparan as Janet
 Junyka Santarin as Jen Jen
 Moi Bien as Isay
 Dudz Teraña as Pinang
 Rowi Du as Tanod Orly
 Denise Joaquin as Delia
 JM Salvado as Kaloy
 Rener Concepcion as Ka Iking
 Laydee Gasalao as Fe
 Pooh as Andie
 Yayo Aguila as Yasmin
 Kat Galang as Mayumi
 Gio Alvarez as Tonio
 Miles Ocampo as Honey
 Mutya Orquia as Veronica
 Giselle Sanchez as Vanessa
 Michelle Vito as Michelle
 Joey Marquez as Daniel
 Izzy Canillo as Ethan
 Marissa Delgado as Governor Virginia
 Sunshine Cruz as Diana
 Ritz Azul as Jackie
 Raul Dillo as Mang Temyeng
 Kakai Bautista as Joyce
 Harvey Bautista as Marius
 Mon Confiado as Greg
 Nikko Natividad as Ulysses
 JC Santos as Alex
 Matet de Leon as Evelyn
 Jairus Aquino as Richard
 Igi Boy Flores as Andoy
 Rhap Aquino as Tanod nando
 Nanette Inventor as Thelma
 Precious Lara Quigaman as Doc Kim
 Angel Albino as Belinda
 Laydee Gasalao as Aling Fe
 Joem Bascon as Nelson
Guest cast
 Ruby Ruiz as Belen Domingo
 Piolo Pascual as Mayor Christopher Charles Juarez

Production
The full trailer for the series was released on March 19, 2021. The show airs every Mondays, Tuesdays and Thursdays from 7:15 p.m. to 8:00 p.m. (PST).  Originally, the show also aired on Wednesdays and Fridays prior to the start of the 2021 PBA season, in which, the show limited its airings to give way to the PBA Season,

From June 16 and 18, 2021 episodes of the show were pre-empted to give way for the 2021 FIBA Asia Cup Qualifiers matches involving the Philippines men's national basketball team.

Also, the Wednesday and Friday episodes from July 16, 2021 onwards were pre-empted to give way to the 2021 PBA season. beginning with the 2021 PBA Philippine Cup. Despite the season ending, the show's Wednesday and Friday airings did not return, being filled by Cine Cinco Hollywood Edition.

The April 14, 2022 episode of the show were pre-empted to give way for the Maundy Thursday special programming in observance of Holy Week.

On May 9, 2022, the show was pre-empted to give way for the TV5's Bilang Pilipino 2022 coverage on the 2022 Philippine general election.

From its premiere until December 30, 2021, the program was also aired on Cignal TV's Colours via a delayed telecast at 8:00 p.m.

This series is currently streaming on Netflix.

Accolades

References

External links
 

2021 Philippine television series debuts
2022 Philippine television series endings
2020s Philippine television series
TV5 (Philippine TV network) drama series
Filipino-language television shows